Food for Thought is the fifth album by German hard rock group Pink Cream 69, released in 1997.

Track listing

Personnel
 David Readman - vocals
 Alfred Koffler - guitar
 Dennis Ward - bass guitar
 Kosta Zafiriou - drums
 Achim Reichelt - keyboards (Tracks 4 & 12)
 Peter Eptinger - timpani (Track 7)

Production
Mixing – Dennis Ward and Gerhard Wolfle
Engineer – Dennis Ward

References

External links
Heavy Harmonies page

Pink Cream 69 albums
1997 albums